Auston is a male given name. Notable people with this name include:

 Auston English (born 1987), American American football player
 Auston Matthews (born 1997), American ice hockey player
 Auston Rotheram (1876–1946), Irish polo player
 Auston Trusty (born 1998), American American football player

See also
 Auston switch
 David H. Auston
 Austin (disambiguation)